Natalia Lafourcade is the self-titled debut album by Mexican singer-songwriter Natalia Lafourcade. It was released on July 8, 2002 by Sony Music Entertainment Mexico, it was produced by Áureo Baqueiro and Loris Ceroni, while the songs were mostly written by Natalia, although Loris Ceroni, Mauricia L. Arriaga and Áureo Baqueiro also participated. Lafourcade performed all the vocal parts for all the songs on the album.

The album's songs "Busca un Problema" and "En el 2000" achieved commercial success in Mexico, the second over the years considered one of the most influential Spanish-language songs of the 2000s, it was also included in the soundtrack of the movie Amar te duele (2002). The song "Mírate, mírame" was also used in the soundtrack of the telenovela Clase 406 (2002).

The album managed to position itself at the top of the Mexican Albums chart. It received a platinum certification from the Asociación Mexicana de Productores de Fonogramas y Videogramas (AMPROFON), for shipments of over 150,000 copies in Mexico. The album received two nominations at the 4th Annual Latin Grammy Awards, for Best New Artist and Best Rock Solo Vocal Album. It also received a nomination for Best Latin Pop Album at 46th Annual Grammy Awards.

Accolades

Track listing

Charts and certifications

Charts

Certifications

References

Natalia Lafourcade albums
2002 debut albums
Sony Music Mexico albums